Alfred E. Brosky (June 9, 1928 – November 28, 2010) was an American football player, and is a member of the College Football Hall of Fame.

Born in Cincinnati, Ohio, Brosky played football at the University of Illinois from 1950 to 1952. He was a member of the Theta Xi fraternity.

In 1950, he finished with 11 INT and followed that up with 11 INT again in 1951.  In 1952, he finished with 8 INT. Brosky set Big Ten Conference single-season football records in interceptions with 11 in 1950 and again in 1951.

As of 2018, Broskys hold the NCAA career records for interceptions with 29 (1950-1952), career interceptions per game at 1.1 (29 interceptions in 27 games), and most consecutive games with an interception at 15 (beginning November 11, 1950, vs. Iowa and ending October 18, 1952, vs. Minnesota).

After college, Brosky played professionally for one season, with the Chicago Cardinals in 1954. Brosky was inducted into the College Football Hall of Fame in 1998.

References

External links
 

1928 births
2010 deaths
Players of American football from Cincinnati
American football defensive backs
Chicago Cardinals players
Illinois Fighting Illini football players
College Football Hall of Fame inductees